Guillermo Martínez (born 5 February 1930) is a Colombian former sports shooter. He competed in the 25 metre pistol event at the 1972 Summer Olympics.

References

External links
 

1930 births
Possibly living people
Colombian male sport shooters
Olympic shooters of Colombia
Shooters at the 1972 Summer Olympics
Place of birth missing (living people)